Luis Gregorio Ramos Misioné (born 15 May 1953) is a Spanish sprint canoeist who competed from the mid-1970s to the mid-1980s. Competing in three Summer Olympics, he won two medals with one silvers (1976: K-4 1000 m) and one bronze (1980: K-2 1000 m).

Ramos also won eight medals at the ICF Canoe Sprint World Championships with a gold (K-4 1000 m: 1975), a silver (K-4 500 m: 1978), and six bronzes (K-1 4 x 500 m: 1975. K-2 1000 m: 1982, K-2 10000 m: 1979, K-4 500 m: 1977, K-4 1000 m: 1977, 1978).

References

1953 births
Canoeists at the 1976 Summer Olympics
Canoeists at the 1980 Summer Olympics
Canoeists at the 1984 Summer Olympics
Living people
Olympic canoeists of Spain
Olympic silver medalists for Spain
Olympic bronze medalists for Spain
Spanish male canoeists
Olympic medalists in canoeing
ICF Canoe Sprint World Championships medalists in kayak
Medalists at the 1980 Summer Olympics
Medalists at the 1976 Summer Olympics
20th-century Spanish people